Yeniyol, Azerbaijan may refer to:
 Birinci Yeniyol
 İkinci Yeniyol 
 Yeniyel
 Yeniyol, Nakhchivan